Eduard Fuchs (31 January 1870, Göppingen – 26 January 1940, Paris) was a German Marxist scholar of culture and history, writer, art collector, and political activist.

Early life 
Fuchs's father was a shopkeeper. Early in his life, the younger Fuchs developed socialist and Marxist political convictions. In 1886, he joined the outlawed political party Sozialistische Arbeiterpartei (the precursor of the modern SPD, Sozialdemokratische Partei Deutschlands). Fuchs received a doctor of law degree and practiced as an attorney. In 1892, he became editor-in-chief of the satiric weekly Süddeutscher Postillon and later co-editor of the Leipziger Volkszeitung.

Political and literary activism 
His inflammatory articles in newspapers—one accusing the Kaiser of being a mass murderer—resulted in periodic jail sentences. During his periods of confinement, Fuchs wrote various social histories utilizing images as one of his primary sources. The first of these was his Karikatur der europäischen Völker (Caricatures of European Peoples), 1902.

He moved to Berlin that same year where he edited the socialist newspaper Vorwärts. The following year he began his magnum opus, an examination of moral practice, Sittengeschichte, eventually running to six volumes by 1912. While engaged in this series, he followed up his interest in caricatures with one devoted to the representation of women, Die Frau in der Karikatur, 1905 (3 vols). Another book documenting the stereotypical representations of Jews appeared in 1912. Fuchs traveled with the artist Max Slevogt to Egypt in 1914, shortly before the outbreak of World War I. He was a pacifist during the War.  Vladimir  Lenin's government put him in charge of prisoner exchange with Germany after the war; he was among the leaders of the German Comintern in Berlin in 1919. Fuchs became a founding member of the Spartakus League and the Communist Party of Germany.  

His interest in societal concerns in caricature led to a research interest in Daumier. Beginning in 1920, Fuchs published a catalogue raisonné on the artist in three volumes. Fuchs campaigned for Heinrich Brandler and his right opposition within the party. Fuchs resigned from the party in 1929, following the expulsion of Brandler, Thalheimer and several other stalwarts and subsequently joined the Communist Party of Germany (Opposition). At Hitler's ascension to power in Germany in 1933, Fuchs was, according to the New York Times, "violently attacked by the Nazi regime and because his second wife, the former Grete Alsberg, was a Jewess, had to flee Germany."

Art collector 
By 1909, Fuchs owned 3,800 lithographs by Daumier in 1909 and By the end of the 1920s, he owned 6,000 prints, 21 paintings and 16 drawings by him. Fuchs also had in his collection 44 paintings and at least 10 watercolors by Max Slevogt, many acquired directly from the artist who was also his friend. Fuchs' collection included19 paintings by Max Liebermann as wella as majolica and porcelain and East Asian objects.  Fuchs possessed the largest collection (120) of Chinese rooflights at that time. For his research he also had over twenty thousand drawings, prints, pamphlets and posters of moral histories.

Fuchs placed his collection in the "Villa Fuchs" which had been built by Mies van der Rohe in 1901 in Berlin-Zehlendorf.

Nazi seizure of Fuchs' art collection 
Fuchs and his wife escaped Nazi Germany in February 1933 via Schaffhausen, Strasbourg and Geneva to Paris. On March 25, 1933, a large-scale Gestapo operation took place at the Villa Fuchs, ostensibly to secure "communist evidence." On October 25, 1933, the Fuchs Collection was officially confiscated, the rooms sealed, and books, posters, and pamphlets taken away. On October 26, 1933, the furniture and the remaining art objects were seized the Zehlendorf tax office. Fuchs' books were banned, confiscated and partially burned.

Exile and death 
In exile in Paris, Fuchs was friends with Walter Benjamin, among others. Fuchs died on January 26, 1940, and was buried on January 29, 1940, in the Père Lachaise cemetery.

Fuchs was survived by his second wife Margarete - called Grete, also Margret Fuchs. She died in exile in New York City on June 7, 1953. His daughter Gertraud from his first marriage to Frida Fuchs (1876-1956) died on May 19, 1960.

Provenance research into Margarete and Eduard Fuch's looted art collection 
From February 2018 to February 2020 and May 2020 to April 2022, research projects were launched to try to reconstruct the history of the Fuchs collection which had been looted by the Nazis.

Works 
 1848 in der Caricatur. München: Ernst 1898
 Die Karikatur der europäischen Völker vom Altertum bis zur Neuzeit (mit Hans Kraemer). Berlin: A. Hoffman 1902
 Die Karikatur der europäischen Völker vom Jahre 1848 bis zur Gegenwart. Berlin: A. Hoffman 1903
 Das erotische Element in der Karikatur. Berlin: A. Hoffman 1904
 Die Frau in der Karikatur. München: Albert Langen 1906
 Richard Wagner in der Karikatur (mit Ernst Kreowski). München: Albert Langen 1907
 Geschichte der erotischen Kunst. Band 1: Das zeitgeschichtliche Problem. München: Albert Langen 1908
 Illustrierte Sittengeschichte vom Mittelalter bis zur Gegenwart, Band 1: Renaissance. München: Albert Langen 1909. Some images
 Illustrierte Sittengeschichte vom Mittelalter bis zur Gegenwart, Band 2: Die galante Zeit. München: Albert Langen 1911
 Illustrierte Sittengeschichte vom Mittelalter bis zur Gegenwart, Band 3: Das bürgerliche Zeitalter. München: Albert Langen 1912
 Die Weiberherrschaft in der Geschichte der Menschheit (mit Alfred Kind). Erster Band. München: Albert Langen 1913
 Die Weiberherrschaft in der Geschichte der Menschheit (mit Alfred Kind). Zweiter Band. München: Albert Langen 1913
 Die Weiberherrschaft in der Geschichte der Menschheit (mit Alfred Kind). Ergänzungsband. München: Albert Langen 1913
 Der Weltkrieg in der Karikatur. Bis zum Vorabend des Krieges". München: Albert Langen 1916
 Die Juden in der Karikatur: Ein Beitrage zur Kulturgeschichte. München: Albert Langen 1921
 Geschichte der erotischen Kunst. Band 2: Das individuelle Problem. Erster Teil. München: Albert Langen 1923
 Tang-Plastik: Chinesische Grabkeramik des VII. bis X. Jahrhunderts. München: Albert Langen, 1924
 Dachreiter und Verwandte: Chinesische Keramik des XV. bis XVIII. Jahrhunderts. München: A. Langen, 1924
 Gavarni. Hrsg. von Eduard Fuchs (mit Paul Gavarni). München: Albert Langen, 1925
 Geschichte der erotischen Kunst. Band 3: Das individuelle Problem. Zweiter Teil. München: Albert Langen 1926
 Honoré Daumier: Holzschnitte 1833–1872. München, A. Langen, 1927.
 Honoré Daumier: Lithographien 1828–1851. München, A. Langen, 1927
 Honoré Daumier: Lithographien 1852–1860. München, A. Langen, 1927.
 Honoré Daumier: Lithographien 1861–1872. München, A. Langen, 1927.
 Der Maler Daumier. München: Albert Langen 1930
 Die grossen Meister der Erotik: Ein Beitrag zum Problem des Schöpferischen in der Kunst; Malerei und Plastik. München: Albert Langen, 1931

Further reading
 Ulrich E Bach: "Eduard Fuchs between Elite and Mass Culture". In: Lynne Tatlock (Ed.): Publishing Culture and the “Reading Nation” . Rochester, NY 2010, S. 294–312. 
 Walter Benjamin: "Eduard Fuchs, der Sammler und der Historiker". In: Zeitschrift für Sozialforschung, Jg. 6, 1937, S. 346–381; English translation "Edward Fuchs, Collector and Historian", in Walter Benjamin Selected Writings, Volume 3 1935–1938, Cambridge, Mass: Harvard University Press, 2002, p260-302. 
 Theodor Bergmann: "Gegen den Strom." Die Geschichte der KPD (Opposition). Hamburg 2001. 
 Honoré Daumier, Eduard Fuchs, Shelley Butler Neltnor: "Holzschnitte, 1833–1870". München: A. Langen, 1918.
 Peter Gorsen: "Wer war Eduard Fuchs?" In: Zeitschrift für Sexualwissenschaft, Jg. 19, Heft 3, Sept. 2006, S. 215-233
 Thomas Huonker: Revolution, Moral & Kunst. Eduard Fuchs: Leben und Werk. Zürich: Limmat Verlag 1985, 
 Ulrich Weitz: Salonkultur und Proletariat: Eduard Fuchs, Sammler, Sittengeschichtler, Sozialist''. Stuttgart: Stöffler & Schütz, c1991.
 Eduard Fuchs, Karl Kaiser, Ernst Klaar, Klaus Völkerling: "Aus dem Klassenkampf: soziale Gedichte". München 1894. Berlin: Akademie-Verlag, 1978.

External links
 
Works by or about Eduard Fuchs in the catalog of the German National Library
Verlustumstand gemeldet als NS-verfolgungsbedingt entzogenes Kulturgut, Eduard Fuchs
Provenienzforschung an der Kunsthalle zu Kiel Gemälde und Skulpturen

References 

1870 births
1940 deaths
People from Göppingen
Social Democratic Party of Germany politicians
Communist Party of Germany politicians
Communist Party of Germany (Opposition) politicians
German activists
German expatriates in France
20th-century German historians
German journalists
German male journalists
Marxist journalists
Marxist writers
German male writers
Subjects of Nazi art appropriations
Burials at Père Lachaise Cemetery